Thomas Jean-Marie Debenest (born 4 August 1973 in Niort, Deux-Sèvres) is a French former professional footballer who played as a goalkeeper.

References 

1973 births
Living people
People from Niort
Sportspeople from Deux-Sèvres
French footballers
Association football goalkeepers
Chamois Niortais F.C. players
Red Star F.C. players
Angers SCO players
Royal Excel Mouscron players
S.C. Beira-Mar players
Ligue 2 players
US Sénart-Moissy players
Footballers from Nouvelle-Aquitaine